In Arabian Nights (subtitled A caravan of Moroccan dreams) is a travel book by Anglo-Afghan author Tahir Shah illustrated by Laetitia Bermejo. which takes up where his previous book The Caliph's House leaves off, recounting, among much else, events at Dar Khalifa, the Caliph's House, in Casablanca where the Shah family have taken up residence.

Summary
Shah frequents the Café Mabrook, which becomes for him the "gateway into the clandestine world of Moroccan men" and is told "if you really want to get to know us, then root out the raconteurs". He also hears of the Berber tradition that each person searches for the story within their heart.

Events at home are interwoven with Shah's journeys across Morocco, and he sees how the Kingdom of Morocco has a substratum of oral tradition that is almost unchanged in a thousand years, a culture in which tales, as well as entertaining, are a matrix through which values, ideas and information are transmitted.

Shah listens to anyone who has a tale to tell. He encounters professional storytellers, a junk merchant who sells his wares for nothing, but insists on a high payment for the tale attached to each item and a door to door salesman who can obtain anything, including, when Shah requests the first "Benares" edition of A Thousand and One Nights by Richard Burton, a translation that the author's father Idries Shah had once given away. As he makes his way through the labyrinthine medinas of Fez and Marrakech, traverses the Sahara sands, and tastes the hospitality of ordinary Moroccans, he collects a treasury of stories, gleaned from the heritage of A Thousand and One Nights. The tales, recounted by a vivid cast of characters, reveal fragments of wisdom and an oriental way of thinking.

Weaving in and out of the narrative are Shah's recollection of his family's first visits to Morocco and his father's storytelling and insistence that traditional tales contain vastly undervalued resources; "We are a family of storytellers. Don't forget it. We have a gift. Protect it and it will protect you."  As a father himself Shah now passes the baton on to his own children.

Reviews

 Review in The Bookbag
 Review in A.V Club
 Review in The Seattle Times
 Review in Frequency of Words
 Review in Kirkus Reviews
 Review in Armchair Archives
 Review in the Journal of the 1001 Nights
 Review in Lotus Reads
 Review in The Storytellers Web
 Review in Seagreen Reader
 Review in Friends of Books
 Review in National Geographic Intelligent Travel Blog
 Review in Directions for getting lost
 Review in Shvoong
 Review in Travel Book Mix
 Review in Al Bab: Impressions of a Middle East past and present
 Review in Outlook Traveller
 Review in Levantine Dreamhouse
 Review in Adventure Collection
 Review in Books to Travel With
 Review in Critic Globe
 Review in Book Buzz
 Review in Kate's Books
 Review in LyzzyBee's Books
 Review in Provo Library Staff Reviews
 Review in White Noise of Everyday Life
 Review in World Hum
 Review in Jov's Book Pyramid
 Review in At Home with Books
 Review in Publishers Weekly

References

External links
 In Arabian Nights on the author's website
 Illustrator Laetitia Bermejo's public page

2008 non-fiction books
American travel books
Storytelling
Books by Tahir Shah
Moroccan storytellers
Doubleday (publisher) books
British travel books
English non-fiction books
Books about Morocco